Asbjørn Kragh Andersen (born 9 April 1992) is a Danish former cyclist, who competed as a professional from 2012 to 2022. He is the older brother of Søren Kragh Andersen, who is also a professional cyclist.

Major results

2010
 6th Overall Trofeo Karlsberg
2012
 10th Neuseen Classics
2013
 1st Stage 2 Course de la Paix U23
 5th Hadeland GP
 7th Skive–Løbet
2014
 1st Stage 2 Szlakiem Grodów Piastowskich
 4th Overall Grand Prix Cycliste de Saguenay
1st  Young rider classification
 4th Overall Tour de Beauce
 5th Time trial, National Road Championships
 5th Rund um Köln
 6th Skive–Løbet
2015
 1st Ringerike GP
 1st Stage 5 Tour du Loir-et-Cher
 1st Stage 5 Flèche du Sud
 1st Stage 3 Paris–Arras Tour
 2nd Himmerland Rundt
 3rd GP Horsens
 5th Fyen Rundt
2016
 1st Stage 4 Tour des Fjords
2017
 7th Gran Premio della Costa Etruschi
 9th Overall Danmark Rundt
2018
 1st  Overall Tour du Loir-et-Cher
1st  Points classification
 2nd Poreč Trophy
 5th Trofej Umag
 7th Veenendaal–Veenendaal Classic
2020
 5th Road race, National Road Championships

References

External links
 

Danish male cyclists
1992 births
Living people
People from Fredericia
Sportspeople from the Region of Southern Denmark